Fort Crawford may refer to:

United States
 Fort Crawford, a 19th-century military outpost of the United States Army located in Prairie du Chien, Wisconsin.
 Fort Crawford (Alabama), provided defense for Alabama settlers in what is today East Brewton, Alabama
 Fort Crawford (Colorado), a 19th-century military post that was located in Montrose County, Colorado